is a chain of department stores primarily in Japan.

The PARCO Group primarily conducts business through its Shopping Complex Business segment, which includes its PARCO Urban Stores, PARCO Community Stores, and Zero Gate complexes. Zero Gate complexes serve as platforms for other retail establishments.

PARCO is currently implementing a hybrid business model that combines retail businesses and real estate. PARCO Group also undertakes property management and consultant projects on a contract basis.

References

External links 
 

Retail companies established in 1953
Japanese companies established in 1953
Retail companies based in Tokyo
Companies listed on the Tokyo Stock Exchange
Department stores of Japan
Japanese brands
J. Front Retailing